The Grigorovich ROM-1 was a long-range reconnaissance flying boat designed by the Grigorovich Design Bureau for the Soviet Navy in the late 1920s.

Design
The ROM-1 (ROM = Razviedchik Otkrytovo Morya [Open Sea Reconnaissance]) was a long range maritime reconnaissance sesquiplane flying boat with two engines installed in a tandem nacelle, supported on struts over the hull. The hull was made from aluminumand the wings were made of wood, attached to the sides of the engine nacelle. The water-tight lower wings, attached to the sides of the hull, were installed slightly above the waterline and carried two floats on their tips. The tail surfaces had aluminum alloy frames with fabric covering.

Development of the ROM-1 commenced in the summer of 1925. V.B.Shavrov was responsible for hull design, and P.D.Samsonov was responsible for the wing and powerplant. The ROM-1 first flew in the autumn of 1927, with test flying concluding in 1929, when the Soviet Navy judged it unsuitable for use as in combat.

Specifications

References

Bibliography

Biplanes
Flying boats
ROM-1
Aircraft first flown in 1927